Richard Dowden (born 20 March 1949 in Surrey, England) is a British journalist who has specialised in African issues. Since 1975, he has worked for several British media and for the past eight years he has been the Executive Director of the Royal African Society. He is the author of the book Africa: Altered States, Ordinary Miracles (Portobello Books, 2008), which has a foreword by the Nigerian writer Chinua Achebe. Dowden lives and works in London.

Journalism 
He first went to Africa in 1971 and worked as a volunteer teacher in a rural part of Uganda, until the end of 1972, when he left the country because of Idi Amin's dictatorship. In Dowden's words, in December 1972, "Amin declared all whites in our area to be spies who had uniforms and guns hidden in their houses. It was time to go".

On his return to Great Britain, Dowden worked for the Catholic Justice and Peace Commission, mainly in Northern Ireland, and turned to journalism in 1975, being made Editor of The Catholic Herald in 1976. After joining The Times foreign desk in 1980, he began to travel to Africa and the Middle East until 1986, when he was appointed Africa Editor at the newly-established newspaper The Independent. In 1995, he became Diplomatic Editor of The Independent, then moved to The Economist as Africa Editor. He has visited and written about almost every country in sub-Saharan Africa. His articles and documentaries in recent years include: 
 "Chinua Achebe: A hero returns" (18 February 2009), BBC World Service
 "Jacob Zuma – a question of competence, not conscience" (23 April 2009), The Sunday Times
 "Britain should cease its one-sided support of Rwanda" (15 December 2008), The Independent
 "Mugabe's power ploy – Zimbabwe's president is using talks with Morgan Tsvangirai to buy time while he prepares for war" (26 July 2008), The Guardian
 "Condescension and ignorance are no help to Kenya – The West's patronising response to the recent events in Kenya betrays our lack of respect to a sophisticated continent" (6 June 2008). The Observer

Africa: Altered States, Ordinary Miracles 

Published in 2008 by Portobello Books, Dowden's first book overviews African contemporary history from an autobiographical point of view, on a journey through the geography of the most troubled continent. "On a more personal level, this is the story of Dowden's love for the continent." As African Affairs, the top-ranked Africanist Journal underlines, the book can be considered between an academic and a popular text, allowing the reader to become interested in the subject even if they are not Africa experts. As Chinua Achebe explains on his foreword: 
"Africa is a vast continent, a continent of people, […]. In Africa: Altered States, Ordinary Miracles, it is clear that Richard Dowden understands this, and one could not ask for a more qualified author to explore Africa's complexity."

Royal African Society Executive Director 

From 2002 to 2017, he was Executive Director at the Royal African Society, an association founded in 1901 to promote relations and a better understanding between Africa and Great Britain. Dowden is on the Editorial Board of African Affairs, journal of the Royal African Society, and together with Alex de Waal coordinates African Arguments, a series of short books and a blog about Africa today. Dowden also promoted the creation of Africa Writes and Film Africa as well as helping to establish the Africa All-Party Parliamentary Group at Westminster in collaboration with Hugh Bayley, MP for York. Dowden also lectures on Africa and its place in the world and he writes a regular blog commenting on contemporary African affairs on the website of the Royal African Society.

References

External links
 Richard Dowden official website – www.richarddowden.info
 Royal African Society – www.royalafricansociety.org
 Africa Asia Centre – www.africaasiacentre.org
 African Arguments – www.africanarguments.org
 Portobello Books – www.portobellobooks.com

English male journalists
Living people
1949 births